Thomas William Misson (11 May 1930 – 31 July 2017) was a British racewalker. He competed in the men's 50 kilometres walk at the 1960 Summer Olympics.

References

External links
 

1930 births
2017 deaths
Athletes (track and field) at the 1960 Summer Olympics
British male racewalkers
Olympic athletes of Great Britain
Place of birth missing